Wives On Strike: The Revolution is a 2018 Nigerian film. It is the sequel to Omoni Oboli's Wives on Strike produced in 2016. The film was written, produced, and directed by Omoni Oboli and was released in cinemas on December 29, 2018.The film serves as a metaphor for the damaging repercussions of domestic violence and the degree to which it has permeated society.

Plot 
The film continues with the story of the market women from the prequel, Wives on Strike, who are now battling against domestic abuse after one of them is killed by her husband, which prompts another strike by the women against their husbands. With their rallying call; "want some sex?", then speak up against domestic violence, the women were able to force the hands of their husbands to stand up for what is right and curb domestic violence.

Cast 
 Omoni Oboli
 Uche Jombo
 Chioma Chukwuka Akpotha
 Odunalade Adekola
 Toyin Abraham
 Sola Sobowale
 Ufuoma McDermott
 Kenneth Okonkwo
 Chioma "Chigul" Omeruah
 Julius Agwu
 Elvina Ibru

References 

2018 films
English-language Nigerian films